D303 is a state road connecting A9 and A8 motorways (Kanfanar interchange) to Rovinj. The road is 13.5 km long.

The road, as well as all other state roads in Croatia, is managed and maintained by Hrvatske ceste, state owned company.

Traffic volume 

Traffic is regularly counted and reported by Hrvatske ceste, operator of the road. Substantial variations between annual (AADT) and summer (ASDT) traffic volumes are attributed to the fact that the road connects A9 motorway carrying substantial tourist traffic to Rovinj, a major summer resort.

Road junctions and populated areas

Sources

See also
 Istrian Y

State roads in Croatia
Transport in Istria County